The 2016 Singapore Cup (also known as the RHB Singapore Cup for sponsorship reasons) is the 19th edition of Singapore's annual premier club football tournament organised by the Football Association of Singapore. Albirex Niigata (S) are the defending champions, having won their first trophy the previous year. The final was won by Albirex Niigata (S) 2-0. Tampines Rovers striker Billy Mehmet received the man of the match award.

Teams

A total of 12 teams participate in the 2016 Singapore Cup. 9 of the teams are from domestic S.League while the other three are invited from Cambodia and the Philippines.

S.League Clubs
  Albirex Niigata (S)
 Balestier Khalsa
  DPMM FC
 Geylang International
 Home United
 Hougang United
 Tampines Rovers
 Warriors FC
  Young Lions

Invited Foreign Teams
  Ceres-La Salle
  Global FC
  Nagaworld FC

Format

Eight teams were drawn for the preliminary round while the other four seeded teams received a bye for that round. The eight teams will play against one another in a single-legged knockout basis. Winners of this round will progress and advance to the quarter-finals. Thereafter, matches are played in two legs with the exception of the one-match final.

For any match in the knockout stage, a draw after 90 minutes of regulation time is followed by two 15 minute periods of extra time to determine a winner. If the teams are still tied, a penalty shoot-out is held to determine a winner.

Bracket

Preliminary round
The draw for the preliminary round was held on 24 April 2016 at Connaught Drive. Eight teams involved in this round will play in a single leg knockout basis. The matches will be played from 26 to 29 May 2016. Winners of this round will progress and advance to the quarter-finals.

Quarter-finals

Four teams (Home United, Geylang International, Global and Ceres-La Salle) will join the four seeded teams in this round after winning their matches in the preliminary round. All matches will be played in a two-legged knockout basis. Away goal rule will not be applied in this tournament. Winners of this round will progress and advance to the semi-finals.

Summary

|}

Matches

Balestier Khalsa won 4–3 on aggregate.

Albirex Niigata (S) won 4–2 on aggregate.

Tampines Rovers won 5–2 on aggregate.

Ceres-La Salle won 5–3 on aggregate.

Semi-finals

Summary

|}

Matches

Albirex Niigata (S) won 2-0 on aggregate.

Tampines Rovers won 5-3 on aggregate.

Third place

Final

Statistics

Top goalscorers

External links
 Official S.League website
 Football Association of Singapore website

References

2016
2016 domestic association football cups
Cup